AON Hanoi Landmark Tower (or AON Landmark 72) is a mixed-use supertall skyscraper in Pham Hung road, Nam Từ Liêm district, Hanoi, Vietnam. The complex consists of one 72-story mixed-use tower with a height of 350 m and two 48-story hotel twin towers. Landmark 72 is located on an area of 46,054 m2 and the total floor area is 609,673 m2, ranked 5th as the largest floor area of a single building in the world. The investor and operator, of the complex is the South Korean-based company Keangnam Enterprises, Ltd. The investment capital is estimated at US$1.05 billion.

The complex features a 5-star InterContinental hotel, offices, entertainment areas, retail spaces, clinics and convention centres. The complex opened on 18 May 2012. Keangnam Enterprises indirectly owned a 70-per cent stake in Landmark 72. The company invested over  1 billion with  510 million borrowed from banks.

Landmark 72 is the site of Vietnam's tallest stair climbing race, the Vietnam Landmark 72 Hanoi Vertical Run. On 30 September 2012, runners competed for the first time to be the fastest to ascend the tower's 1,914 steps.

History 

On 11 June 2008, an agreement was signed between the building owner and the InterContinental Hotels Group to operate the 359-room hotel under InterContinental Hanoi Landmark 72 with 9 hotel floors from the 62nd floor to 70th floor (Hotel Club Lounge located on the 71st Floor).

In November 2010, the main tower reached approximately 300 metres, making it the tallest building and structure in Vietnam. On 24 January 2011, the main tower topped out at 350 metres; it became the tallest building in Vietnam while the other two towers had topped out months before with the height of 212 metres. The complex opened on 18 May 2012. The building held the status of the tallest building in Vietnam until Landmark 81 was built in 2018.

A Vietnamese court valued the complex at  770 million in May 2015 and AON Holdings from South Korea would take over the bank loan by paying  373.4 million to become the majority owner.

In early 2017, it emerged that a bribery scheme related to a proposed sale of Landmark 72 building complex in 2014 led to the arrest and charge of former UN Secretary-General Ban Ki-moon's nephew and charge of Ban's brother, Ban Ki-sang, an executive of South Korean firm Keangnam Enterprises Co Ltd. In 2013, Keangnam was facing a liquidity crisis and intended to refinance or sell the complex. When the deal eventually fell through, Keangnam entered into court receivership in South Korea. Also, Malcolm Albert Harris, a self proclaimed New York City fashion designer who pled guilty to stealing US$500,000 as part of a phony negotiation to sell Landmark 72 to a Qatari royal.

See also

 List of tallest buildings in the world
 List of tallest residential buildings in the world
 List of tallest hotels in the world
 InterContinental Hanoi Landmark 72

Notes
Landmark 81 structurally topped out in January 2018 at 400 meters.

References

External links
 Official website
 

Skyscrapers in Hanoi
Twin towers
Skyscraper office buildings in Vietnam
Skyscraper hotels
Residential skyscrapers